Shearwater is a community in coastal British Columbia. It is located three miles from Old Bella Bella on Denny Island. It is in the territory of the Heiltsuk Nation.

History 
Shearwater was originally built as an antisubmarine bomber reconnaissance post in 1941 and then abandoned in 1944. It was then purchased and developed into a fishing resort with a full service marina, fishing resort, restaurant and hotel. The hangar and the bomb shelter are all that survive from the original base.

Today, Shearwater survives on its fishing resort, locals and commercial fishermen.

It was named after HMS Shearwater, a Royal Navy vessel on the British Columbia coast  from 1902 to 1915 when she was transferred to the Royal Canadian Navy.

Community 
There is a Canada Post branch for the community of Denny Island (V0T-1B0) located inside the grocery and liquor store.  There is also a laundromat, gift shops, clothing store and gardening store just up the road.  There is a small community school with seven students from grades K–7.  There are approximately 50 full-time residents.

Accommodations in the town include the Shearwater Resort, La La Land, the Denny Island B&B, and the Whiskey Cove B&B.

Transportation 
The Shearwater Resort operates an hourly or bi-hourly ferry service to Bella Bella. If taking the BC Ferries "Discovery Coast Passage" route, you can take the Ferries South to Port Hardy or North/East to a number of communities including: Bella Bella, Bella Coola, Klemtu, and Ocean Falls.  There are a limited number of roads on Denny Island.

The Shearwater resort charters a plane for bringing its guests up. Pacific Coastal Airlines operates flights twice daily in the summer and daily in the winter to Bella Bella from Vancouver International Airport South, also Air North has Seasonal Charters from Vancouver International Airport South to Bella Bella. From there, boat service is available to Shearwater itself.

See also
List of World War II-era fortifications on the British Columbia Coast

References

External links
www.britishcolumbia.com
School District #49 - Welcome
www.bcferries.com schedules
www.pacificcoastal.com

Canadian Forces bases in Canada (closed)
Military airbases in British Columbia
Central Coast of British Columbia